Radcliffes's night frog (Nyctibatrachus radcliffei) is a species of frog in the family Nyctibatrachidae. It is endemic to the Western Ghats.

Taxonomy 
The species specific name is in honor of Major Richard Radcliffe, to appreciate his contribution to the conservation of wildlife in the Nilgiris.

Habitat and distribution 
The species is known only from its type locality in the Thiashola estate, in the Nilgiris north of the Palghat Gap.

References 

Amphibians described in 2017
Frogs of India
Nyctibatrachus
Endemic fauna of the Western Ghats